Circassian chicken (Adyghe: Jed de ships sch'etu) is a dish of shredded boiled chicken served under or in a rich paste made with crushed walnuts, and stock thickened with stale bread. Circassian Chicken is a classic Circassian dish, adopted by the Imperial Ottoman cuisine. Although it was typically served as a main course, it became popular as an appetizer, or meze. Being an Imperial-era dish, it can also be found in other cuisines of the Eastern Mediterranean. A similar walnut sauce and a chicken dish made with this sauce is known as satsivi in Georgian cuisine.

See also
 List of chicken dishes

References
 

Circassian cuisine
Chicken dishes
Walnut dishes
Ottoman cuisine
Meze